The Uniform Trust Code is a model law in the United States, which although not binding, is influential in the states, and used by many as a model law. As of January 1, 2020, 34 States have enacted a version of the Uniform Trust Code (Alabama, Arizona, Arkansas, Colorado, Connecticut, Florida, Illinois, Kansas, Kentucky, Maine, Maryland, Massachusetts, Michigan, Minnesota, Mississippi, Missouri, Montana, Nebraska, New Jersey, New Hampshire, New Mexico, North Carolina, North Dakota, Ohio, Oregon, Pennsylvania, South Carolina, Tennessee, Utah, Vermont, Virginia, West Virginia, Wisconsin, and Wyoming). Legislation has currently been proposed in New York to adopt the UTC.

Background
The goal of the uniform law is to standardize the law of trusts to a greater extent, given their increased use as a substitute for the "last will and testament" as the primary estate planning mechanism.

Contents

The Uniform Trust Code consists of eleven articles:
 General Provisions and Definitions
 Judicial Proceedings
 Representation
 Creation, Validity, Modification and Termination of a Trust
 Creditor's Claim, Spendthrift and Discretionary Trusts
 Revocable Trusts
 Office of Trustee
 Duties and Powers of the Trustee
 Uniform Prudent Investor Act
 Liability of Trustees and Rights of Persons Dealing with the Trustee
 Miscellaneous Provisions

See also
US trusts law
English trusts law
Uniform Probate Code
Uniform Power of Attorney Act

Notes

External links
Trust Code, Uniform Law Commission - detailed information including an enactment status map
Law Commission
Text of the Uniform Trust Code 2005
The Uniform Trust Code (2005) - overview of the act by law professor David English up through 2005
https://www.mattersoftrustlaw.com/2016/03/uniform-trust-code-will-impact-blog/

United States trusts law
Wills and trusts
Uniform Acts